Charles Bonaparte may refer to:
Carlo Buonaparte (1746–1785), Corsican attorney, father of Napoleon I of France
Charles Lucien Bonaparte (1803–1857), Prince Canino, French naturalist and ornithologist
Charles Joseph Bonaparte (1851–1921), United States Attorney General
Charles, Prince Napoléon (born 1950), pretender to the Imperial Throne of France
 Charles Bonaparte, a character in the manga series Freezing